Maria Benvinda Levy is a Mozambican politician and former judge.

Career
Benvinda Levy was appointed Minister of Justice
by President Armando Guebuza on March 11, 2008,
succeeding Esperança Machavela, a jurist and former ambassador to Portugal. Benvinda Levy's appointment came as part of a cabinet shuffle that also involved the replacement of foreign minister Alcinda Abreu and transport minister António Munguambe.

Prior to her appointment, Benvinda Levy directed the Legal and Judicial Training Centre and had served as a judge on the Maputo City Court.

References 

Mozambican judges
Living people
Year of birth missing (living people)
FRELIMO politicians
Justice ministers of Mozambique
Women judges
Women government ministers of Mozambique
Female justice ministers
21st-century Mozambican women politicians
21st-century Mozambican politicians